The Grand Council of Basel-Stadt is the legislature of the canton of Basel-Stadt, in Switzerland. Basel-Stadt has a unicameral legislature. The Grand Council has 100 seats, with members elected every four years. Members of the canton's executive, the Executive Council, are elected on the same day.

At the 2008 election, held on 14 September 2008, the Social Democratic Party fared badly, but retained its dominant position, with more than twice as many seats as the next-largest party, the Swiss People's Party (SVP). The legislature was reduced from 130 seats to 100, making all existing parties to lose ground. However, the SVP and Green Party both did relatively well, as did the new centrist Green Liberal Party, which won five seats.

At the 2012 election, held on 28 October 2012, the Volksaktion, a populist anti-immigration party, was able to win two seats, while the Evangelical People's Party lost all but one of their seats.

At the 2016 election, held on 23 October 2016, the Social Democrats, the Greens and the Liberals won the election, while the Christian Democratic People's Party, the Green Liberals and the FDP lost popular vote and seats in the Grand Council. The Volksaktion lost their two seats they won four years before.

Election
The council is re-elected every four years.  Like other legislatures in Switzerland, elections use party list proportional representation.  There are five constituencies.  The communities of Riehen and Bettingen each form a constituency, whilst the city of Basel is divided into three constituencies: the area north of the river Rhine is Kleinbasel, whilst the remaining Grossbasel is arbitrarily split into Grossbasel East and Grossbasel West.

Election overview 1988–2020 

Election result

Distribution of seats

Footnotes

1 SD: until 2004: SD, 2008: SD/EDU
2 EVP: until 2004: VEW, 2008: EVP
3 GB: 1996: GB, 2000: BastA (Greens and FraP), 2004 and 2008: GB
4 1988: additionally: PvA: 2.0%
5 VA: 2 seats, AB (Aktives Bettingen): 1 seat

References

External links
  Grand Council of Basel-Stadt official website

Basel-Stadt
Politics of Basel-Stadt
Basel-Stadt